The Horse and Groom is a grade II listed public house in Park Street, Hatfield, Hertfordshire, England. The building is based on a seventeenth-century or earlier timber frame with a later red brick casing. The building is currently a highly rated pub.

References

External links

Pubs in Welwyn Hatfield (district)
Grade II listed pubs in Hertfordshire
Hatfield, Hertfordshire
Timber framed pubs in Hertfordshire